The American Foundation for Children with AIDS (AFCA) is a non-profit organization that helps children in sub-Saharan Africa, as well as their guardians, who are HIV positive or who have contracted AIDS and lack access to appropriate medical care. Sub-Saharan Africa has been most affected by the HIV/AIDS epidemic, given that of all new HIV infections in the world, those in sub-Saharan Africa account for more than two-thirds of that number, as of 2008.  In helping to fight the battle against HIV/AIDS in sub-Saharan Africa, AFCA provides critical antiretroviral medicine and other related medications, medical equipment and supplies, sustainable food solutions for families and institutions helping orphans, emergency supplies needed by the institutions in AFCA's targeted areas, as well as critical support for the prevention of HIV/AIDS, which included training of personnel. Currently, AFCA collaborates with twenty-eight partners in the Democratic Republic of the Congo, Kenya, Malawi, Uganda, and Zimbabwe.

History
The organization, operating under the name Global Foundation for Children with AIDS until 2005, received its 501(c)(3) status in March 2004. Its headquarters were originally located in Lawrence, KS, but were moved to Harrisburg, PA, in August 2008. AFCA's first partners were the Pediatric Infectious Disease Clinic at the Mulago Hospital in Kampala, Uganda; St. Mary's Mission Hospital in Nairobi, Kenya; and the Mombasa Community-Based Health Care and AIDS Relief Program in Mombasa, Kenya. AFCA expanded its partnerships in 2005 to include St. Joseph's Shelter of Hope Center in Voi, Kenya, later adding St. Mary's Mission Hospital and St. Theresa's Home of Hope in Elementita, Kenya, in 2007. Also in 2007, AFCA began working with a program called Zimbabwe Orphans through Extended Hands (ZOE) in Bulawayo, Zimbabwe. In 2008, AFCA began partnering with the Church of the Ascension in Bulawayo, Zimbabwe and in 2009, AFCA expanded its partnerships by collaborating with Tandala Hospital in the Democratic Republic of the Congo and Kilembe Mines Hospital and Cooley Clinic in Uganda. In 2011, AFCA expanded its partnerships to include 16 additional clinics in the Democratic Republic of Congo. In 2012, AFCA added Mpumudde Clinic and Atutur Hospital in Uganda to its partner list and in 2014, AFCA created livelihoods programs in Tandala and Gemena, in the Democratic Republic of the Congo. In 2019, AFCA started work in Mzuzu, Malawi.

AFCA is a member of the Children's Medical Charities of America and in May 2007, AFCA received the Best in America Seal of Excellence from the Independent Charities of America. This seal is awarded “to the members of Independent Charities of America and  Local Independent Charities of America that have, upon rigorous independent review, been able to certify, document, and demonstrate on an annual basis that they meet the highest standards of public accountability, program effectiveness, and cost effectiveness. These standards include those required by the US Government for inclusion in the Combined Federal Campaign, probably the most exclusive fund drive in the world. Of the 1,000,000 charities operating in the United States today, it is estimated that fewer than 50,000, or 5 percent, meet or exceed these standards, and, of those, fewer than 2,000 have been awarded this Seal.”

Ratings and reviews
AFCA meets 20 out of 20 standards from the Better Business Bureau.

AFCA has earned a 4 out of 4 rating with Charity Navigator.

AFCA is considered a Top-Rated Charity, earning a B+ rating from Charity Watch.

AFCA is a Platinum-level GuideStar Exchange participant, demonstrating its commitment to transparency.

Mission
The mission of AFCA is to "provide critical comprehensive services to infected and affected HIV+ children and their caregivers. Our programs are efficient, promoting self-reliance and sustainability. Since 2005, in collaboration with our in-country partners, we have served tens of thousands of families in some of the most underserved and marginalized communities in Africa.  Our areas of impact include: medical support, livelihoods, educational support and emergency relief.”

AFCA's approach to HIV care is family oriented. In addition to providing care for HIV-infected children from ages 0 through 19, the organization provides pregnant women who are HIV positive with the antiretroviral medication required to prevent the transmission of HIV to their unborn children. This preventive care is an important aspect of the care provided by AFCA since according to UNAIDS, reversal of the global HIV epidemic will not occur unless there is a decrease in the number of new HIV infections.  AFCA also provides antiretroviral and other medicines for the HIV-positive guardians of infected children to prolong the guardians’ lives, thus preventing the children from becoming orphans. Believing that children and guardians in their programs should become self-reliant, AFCA provides livestock (goats, chickens, pigs, and rabbits), seeds and tools, water filters, and solar lights to families who've been affected by HIV/AIDS and who want to escape the ravages of poverty.  With husbandry and gardening training and monthly follow ups, the families are able to provide for themselves and not to rely on external help. 

AFCA supports training centers for HIV+ mothers, most of them widowed. A sisal production project, a rice paddy, a piggery, tailoring shops, and a hair dressing training facility are all part of an endeavor to help mothers earn fair wages while having time to take care of their children and of themselves. 

Greenhouses and large gardens are part of the work AFCA does to help orphanages become self sufficient while teaching older adolescents and young people how to plant, harvest and sell vegetables and fruit. Income benefits the workers and the children's homes, while the food feeds not only the orphaned children but also the community who purchases the excess produce.

A newer program AFCA supports is the building of long drop latrines for families affected by AIDS. Built with eco bricks and including the families in the process, this project allows them to have a safe and decent place to use the toilet, which directly impacts the safety and health of women and girls. 

AFCA maintains a warehouse in Lebanon, PA where medical supplies and equipment are stored, packaged, inventoried, and from where they are sent to hospitals and clinics in the countries AFCA works. Hospitals request specific supplies or equipment and AFCA delivers them to their doorstep in order to help them grow their capacity and ability to give good care to their patients, including the children AFCA serves.

AFCA runs a program called Vacation with a Purpose, inviting people from all walks of life to visit their programs in Africa while building a house for AIDS orphans, painting a clinic, playing with children, working side by side with medical personnel, doing administrative tasks, gardening, and much more.  This program takes teams to Democratic Republic of Congo, Kenya and Zimbabwe.

The main fundraiser AFCA utilizes to fulfill its mission is called Climb Up So Kids Can Grow Up. This fundraiser consists of outdoor events, which cater to individuals of any age or ability: Climb Up: Kilimanjaro, Climb Up: Nigeria, Climb Up: Nepal, Climb Up: New Zealand and Climb Up: Peru are some of the events currently supporting AFCA's work.

Assets
As of 2021 the American Foundation for Children with Aids had net assets, end of year of $516,866.

Funding details
Funding details as of 2021:

References

External links
 
 Informative link

Medical and health foundations in the United States
HIV/AIDS organizations in the United States